Oscillation is the repetitive or periodic variation, typically in time, of some measure about a central value (often a point of equilibrium) or between two or more different states. Familiar examples of oscillation include a swinging pendulum and alternating current. Oscillations can be used in physics to approximate complex interactions, such as those between atoms.

Oscillations occur not only in mechanical systems but also in dynamic systems in virtually every area of science: for example the beating of the human heart (for circulation),  business cycles in economics, predator–prey population cycles in ecology, geothermal geysers in geology, vibration of strings in guitar and other string instruments, periodic firing of nerve cells in the brain, and the periodic swelling of Cepheid variable stars in astronomy. The term vibration is precisely used to describe a mechanical oscillation.

Oscillation, especially rapid oscillation, may be an undesirable phenomenon in process control and control theory (e.g. in sliding mode control), where the aim is convergence to stable state. In these cases it is called chattering or flapping, as in valve chatter, and route flapping.

The simplest mechanical oscillating system is a weight attached to a linear spring subject to only weight and tension.  Such a system may be approximated on an air table or ice surface.  The system is in an equilibrium state when the spring is static. If the system is displaced from the equilibrium, there is a net restoring force on the mass, tending to bring it back to equilibrium.  However, in moving the mass back to the equilibrium position, it has acquired momentum which keeps it moving beyond that position, establishing a new restoring force in the opposite sense.  If a constant force such as gravity is added to the system, the point of equilibrium is shifted.  The time taken for an oscillation to occur is often referred to as the oscillatory period.

The systems where the restoring force on a body is directly proportional to its displacement, such as the dynamics of the spring-mass system, are described mathematically by the simple harmonic oscillator and the regular periodic motion is known as simple harmonic motion.  In the spring-mass system, oscillations occur because, at the static equilibrium displacement, the mass has kinetic energy which is converted into potential energy stored in the spring at the extremes of its path.  The spring-mass system illustrates some common features of oscillation, namely the existence of an equilibrium and the presence of a restoring force which grows stronger the further the system deviates from equilibrium.

In the case of the spring-mass system, Hooke's law states that the restoring force of a spring is:

By using Newton's second law, the differential equation can be derived:

where 

The solution to this differential equation produces a sinusoidal position function:

These are determined by the initial conditions of the system. Because cosine oscillates between 1 and −1 infinitely, our spring-mass system would oscillate between the positive and negative amplitude forever without friction.

Two-dimensional oscillators 
In two or three dimensions, harmonic oscillators behave similarly to one dimension. The simplest example of this is an isotropic oscillator, where the restoring force is proportional to the displacement from equilibrium with the same restorative constant in all directions.

This produces a similar solution, but now there is a different equation for every direction.

Anisotropic oscillators 
With anisotropic oscillators, different directions have different constants of restoring forces. The solution is similar to isotropic oscillators, but there is a different frequency in each direction. Varying the frequencies relative to each other can produce interesting results. For example, if the frequency in one direction is twice that of another, a figure eight pattern is produced. If the ratio of frequencies is irrational, the motion is quasiperiodic. This motion is periodic on each axis, but is not periodic with respect to r, and will never repeat.

Damped oscillations

All real-world oscillator systems are thermodynamically irreversible.  This means there are dissipative processes such as friction or electrical resistance which continually convert some of the energy stored in the oscillator into heat in the environment.  This is called damping.  Thus, oscillations tend to decay with time unless there is some net source of energy into the system. The simplest description of this decay process can be illustrated by oscillation decay of the harmonic oscillator.

Damped oscillators are created when a resistive force is introduced, which is dependent on the first derivative of the position, or in this case velocity. The differential equation created by Newton's second law adds in this resistive force with an arbitrary constant . This example assumes a linear dependence on velocity.

This equation can be rewritten as before:
 
where .

This produces the general solution:

where .

There are 3 categories of damped oscillators: under-damped, where ; over-damped, where ; and critically damped, where .

Driven oscillations 
In addition, an oscillating system may be subject to some external force, as when an AC circuit is connected to an outside power source.  In this case the oscillation is said to be driven. 

The simplest example of this is a spring-mass system with a sinusoidal driving force.
where 

This gives the solution: 
where  and 

The transient solution can be found by using the initial conditions of the system.

Some systems can be excited by energy transfer from the environment.  This transfer typically occurs where systems are embedded in some fluid flow.  For example, the phenomenon of flutter in aerodynamics occurs when an arbitrarily small displacement of an aircraft wing (from its equilibrium) results in an increase in the angle of attack of the wing on the air flow and a consequential increase in lift coefficient, leading to a still greater displacement.  At sufficiently large displacements, the stiffness of the wing dominates to provide the restoring force that enables an oscillation.

Resonance 
Resonance occurs in a damped driven oscillator when ω = ω0, that is, when the driving frequency is equal to the natural frequency of the system. When this occurs, the denominator of the amplitude is minimized, which maximizes the amplitude of the oscillations.

Coupled oscillations

The harmonic oscillator and the systems it models have a single degree of freedom.  More complicated systems have more degrees of freedom, for example, two masses and three springs (each mass being attached to fixed points and to each other).  In such cases, the behavior of each variable influences that of the others.  This leads to a coupling of the oscillations of the individual degrees of freedom.  For example, two pendulum clocks (of identical frequency) mounted on a common wall will tend to synchronise. This phenomenon was first observed by Christiaan Huygens in 1665.  The apparent motions of the compound oscillations typically appears very complicated but a more economic, computationally simpler and conceptually deeper description is given by resolving the motion into normal modes.

The simplest form of coupled oscillators is a 3 spring, 2 mass system, where masses and spring constants are the same. This problem begins with deriving Newton's second law for both masses.

The equations are then generalized into matrix form.

These matrices can now be plugged into the general solution.

The determinant of this matrix yields a quadratic equation.

Depending on the starting point of the masses, this system has 2 possible frequencies (or a combination of the two). If the masses are started with their displacements in the same direction, the frequency is that of a single mass system, because the middle spring is never extended. If the two masses are started in opposite directions, the second, faster frequency is the frequency of the system.

More special cases are the coupled oscillators where energy alternates between two forms of oscillation. Well-known is the Wilberforce pendulum, where the oscillation alternates between the elongation of a vertical spring and the rotation of an object at the end of that spring.

Coupled oscillators are a common description of two related, but different phenomena. One case is where both oscillations affect each other mutually, which usually leads to the occurrence of a single, entrained oscillation state, where both oscillate with a compromise frequency. Another case is where one external oscillation affects an internal oscillation, but is not affected by this. In this case the regions of synchronization, known as Arnold Tongues, can lead to highly complex phenomena as for instance chaotic dynamics.

Small oscillation approximation 
In physics, a system with a set of conservative forces and an equilibrium point can be approximated as a harmonic oscillator near equilibrium. An example of this is the Lennard-Jones potential, where the potential is given by:

The equilibrium points of the function are then found:

The second derivative is then found, and used to be the effective potential constant:

The system will undergo oscillations near the equilibrium point. The force that creates these oscillations is derived from the effective potential constant above:

This differential equation can be re-written in the form of a simple harmonic oscillator:

Thus, the frequency of small oscillations is:

Or, in general form

This approximation can be better understood by looking at the potential curve of the system. By thinking of the potential curve as a hill, in which, if one placed a ball anywhere on the curve, the ball would roll down with the slope of the potential curve. This is true due to the relationship between potential energy and force.

This approximation is also useful for thinking of Kepler orbits.

Continuous systems – waves

As the number of degrees of freedom becomes arbitrarily large, a system approaches continuity; examples include a string or the surface of a body of water. Such systems have (in the classical limit) an infinite number of normal modes and their oscillations occur in the form of waves that can characteristically propagate.

Mathematics

The mathematics of oscillation deals with the quantification of the amount that a sequence or function tends to move between extremes.  There are several related notions: oscillation of a sequence of real numbers, oscillation of a real-valued function at a point, and oscillation of a function on an interval (or open set).

Examples

Mechanical

Double pendulum
Foucault pendulum
Helmholtz resonator
Oscillations in the Sun (helioseismology), stars (asteroseismology) and Neutron-star oscillations. 
Quantum harmonic oscillator
Playground swing
String instruments
Torsional vibration
Tuning fork
Vibrating string
Wilberforce pendulum
Lever escapement

Electrical

Alternating current
Armstrong (or Tickler or Meissner) oscillator
Astable multivibrator
Blocking oscillator
Butler oscillator
Clapp oscillator
Colpitts oscillator
Delay-line oscillator
Electronic oscillator
Extended interaction oscillator
Hartley oscillator
Oscillistor
Phase-shift oscillator
Pierce oscillator
Relaxation oscillator
RLC circuit
Royer oscillator
Vačkář oscillator
Wien bridge oscillator

Electro-mechanical
Crystal oscillator

Optical

Laser (oscillation of electromagnetic field with frequency of order 1015 Hz)
Oscillator Toda or self-pulsation  (pulsation of output power of laser at frequencies 104 Hz – 106 Hz in the transient regime)
Quantum oscillator may refer to an optical local oscillator, as well as to a usual model in quantum optics.

Biological

Circadian rhythm
Bacterial Circadian Rhythms
Circadian oscillator
Lotka–Volterra equation
Neural oscillation
Oscillating gene
Segmentation clock

Human oscillation

Neural oscillation
Insulin release oscillations
gonadotropin releasing hormone pulsations
Pilot-induced oscillation
Voice production

Economic and social

Business cycle
Generation gap
Malthusian economics
News cycle

Climate and geophysics

Atlantic multidecadal oscillation
Chandler wobble
Climate oscillation
El Niño-Southern Oscillation
Pacific decadal oscillation
Quasi-biennial oscillation

Astrophysics
Neutron stars
Cyclic Model

Quantum mechanical
Neutral particle oscillation, e.g. neutrino oscillations
Quantum harmonic oscillator

Chemical

Belousov–Zhabotinsky reaction
Mercury beating heart
Briggs–Rauscher reaction
Bray–Liebhafsky reaction

Computing
Cellular Automata oscillator

See also

Antiresonance
Beat (acoustics)
BIBO stability
Critical speed
Cycle (music)
Dynamical system
Earthquake engineering
Feedback
Fourier transform for computing periodicity in evenly spaced data
Frequency
Hidden oscillation
Least-squares spectral analysis for computing periodicity in unevenly spaced data
Oscillator phase noise
Periodic function
Phase noise
Quasiperiodicity
Reciprocating motion
Resonator
Rhythm
Seasonality
Self-oscillation
Signal generator
Squegging
Strange attractor
Structural stability
Tuned mass damper
Vibration
Vibrator (mechanical)

References

External links

Vibrations – a chapter from an online textbook